George Callender may refer to:

 George Russell Callender (1884–1973), American physician and army officer
 George William Callender (1830–1878), English surgeon